Nelli Vasilyevna Feryabnikova (born 14 May 1949) is a Russian former basketball player who competed in the 1976 Summer Olympics and in the 1980 Summer Olympics.

References

1949 births
Living people
Russian women's basketball players
Olympic basketball players of the Soviet Union
Basketball players at the 1976 Summer Olympics
Basketball players at the 1980 Summer Olympics
Olympic gold medalists for the Soviet Union
Olympic medalists in basketball
Soviet women's basketball players
Medalists at the 1980 Summer Olympics
Medalists at the 1976 Summer Olympics